Levina is both a surname and a given name. Notable people with the name include:

Surname:
 Elizaveta Levina, Russian-American statistician
 Olga Levina (disambiguation), multiple people
 Olga Levina (handballer), (born 1985), Russian handball player
 Tatyana Levina (born 1977), Russian sprinter
 Yuliya Levina (born 1973), Russian rower
 Zara Levina (1906–1976), pianist and composer

Given name:
 Levina (singer) (born 1991), German singer, born Isabella Lueen
 Levina Teerlinc, Flemish miniaturist

See also
 , an Indonesian passenger ferry
 Levin (disambiguation)

Russian-language surnames
Russian-Jewish surnames